Denbigh was a county constituency centred on the town of Denbigh in North Wales.  It returned one Member of Parliament (MP) to the House of Commons of the Parliament of the United Kingdom, elected by the first-past-the-post voting system.

The constituency was created for the 1918 general election, and abolished for the 1983 general election.

Boundaries

This was a county division of Denbighshire. In 1918 it comprised the whole of the county, except for the Municipal Borough of Wrexham and part of the Chirk Rural District, which formed the Wrexham division.

The local authorities in the Denbigh division were the Municipal Boroughs of Denbigh and Ruthin; the Urban Districts of Abergele and Pensarn, Colwyn Bay and Colwyn, Llangollen, and Llanrwst; and the Rural Districts of Llangollen, Llanrwst, Llansillin, Ruthin, St Asaph (Denbigh), and Uwchaled, part of Chirk, and the part of Glan Conway not in Caernarvonshire.

The local authorities in Denbighshire were reorganised in 1935, but that did not affect the boundaries of the parliamentary constituency.

In the redistribution which took effect in 1950, the division was redefined as comprising the Municipal Boroughs of Colwyn Bay, Denbigh, and Ruthin; the Urban Districts of Abergele, Llangollen, and Llanrwst; and the Rural Districts of Aled, Hiraethog, Ruthin, part of Ceiriog, and part of Wrexham. The same local authorities remained within the constituency in the 1974 redistribution.

Members of Parliament

1 A party led by David Lloyd George, which succeeded the Coalition Liberals.

2 A party allied with the Conservative Party.

Election results

Elections in the 1910s

Elections in the 1920s

Elections in the 1930s

Elections in the 1940s
General Election 1939–40:
Another General Election was due to take place before the end of 1940. From 1939, the parties had been making preparations for an election, and by the end of that year, the following candidates had been selected:
Liberal National: Henry Morris-Jones
Liberal: Garner Evans
Labour: J. R. Hughes

Elections in the 1950s

Elections in the 1960s

Elections in the 1970s

See also
Denbighshire (UK Parliament constituency) (abolished 1885)
East Denbighshire (UK Parliament constituency) (1885–1918)
West Denbighshire (UK Parliament constituency) (1885–1918)

References

 Boundaries of Parliamentary Constituencies 1885-1972, compiled and edited by F.W.S. Craig (Parliamentary Reference Publications 1972)
 British Parliamentary Election Results 1918-1949, compiled and edited by F.W.S. Craig (Macmillan Press, revised edition 1977)
 British Parliamentary Election Results 1950-1973, compiled and edited  by F.W.S. Craig (Parliamentary Research Services 1983)
 British Parliamentary Election Results 1974-1983, compiled and edited  by F.W.S. Craig (Parliamentary Research Services 1984)

Historic parliamentary constituencies in North Wales
History of Denbighshire
Constituencies of the Parliament of the United Kingdom established in 1918
Constituencies of the Parliament of the United Kingdom disestablished in 1983